Anastasia Tikhonova may refer to:

 Anastasia Rudnaya (born 1990), née Tikhonova, Russian orienteering competitor
 Anastasia Tikhonova (tennis) (born 2001), Russian tennis player